The 2024 Summer Olympics, officially the Games of the XXXIII Olympiad and commonly known as Paris 2024, is an upcoming international multi-sport event that is scheduled to take place from 26 July to 11 August 2024 with Paris as its main host city and 16 cities spread across Metropolitan France and one in Tahiti—an island within the French overseas country and overseas collectivity of French Polynesia—as a subsite.

Paris was awarded the Games at the 131st IOC Session in Lima, Peru, on 13 September 2017. Due to multiple withdrawals that left only Paris and Los Angeles in contention, the International Olympic Committee (IOC) approved a process to concurrently award the 2024 and 2028 Summer Olympics to the two cities. Having previously hosted in 1900 and 1924, Paris will become the second city to host the Summer Olympics three times after London (1908, 1948 and 2012). Paris 2024 will mark the centenary of Paris 1924, be the sixth Olympic games hosted by France (three in summer – 1900, 1924, 2024 and three in winter – 1924, 1968, 1992), and the first Olympic Games in France since the 1992 Winter Olympics in Albertville. The event will return to its traditional 4-year Olympiad cycle, after the 2020 Summer Olympics in Tokyo, which was delayed to 2021 due to the COVID-19 pandemic. The Games would be the first of three successive Summer Olympics to use only two official languages (English and French).

The Games will feature the debut of breaking (breakdancing) as an Olympic event, and it will also be the final Olympic Games held during the presidency of IOC President Thomas Bach.

The games are expected to cost $8.5 billion.

Bidding process

Paris, Hamburg, Budapest, Rome, and Los Angeles were the five candidate cities. The process was slowed by withdrawals, political uncertainty, and deterring costs. Hamburg withdrew its bid on 29 November 2015 after holding a referendum. Rome withdrew on 21 September 2016 citing fiscal difficulties. On 22 February 2017, Budapest withdrew after a petition against the bid collected more signatures than necessary for a referendum.

Following these withdrawals, the IOC Executive Board met in Lausanne, Switzerland, to discuss the 2024 and 2028 bid processes on 9 June 2017. The International Olympic Committee formally proposed electing the 2024 and 2028 Olympic host cities at the same time in 2017, a proposal which an Extraordinary IOC Session approved on 11 July 2017 in Lausanne. The IOC set up a process whereby the LA 2024 and Paris 2024 bid committees met with the IOC to discuss who would host the Games in 2024 and 2028, and whether it was possible to select the host cities for both at the same time.

Following the decision to award the two Games simultaneously, Paris was understood as the preferred host for 2024. On 31 July 2017, the IOC announced Los Angeles as the sole candidate for 2028, enabling Paris to be confirmed as host for 2024. Both decisions were ratified at the 131st IOC Session on 13 September 2017.

Host city election
Paris was elected as the host city on 13 September 2017 at the 131st IOC Session in Lima, Peru. The two French IOC members, Guy Drut and Tony Estanguet, were ineligible to vote under the rules of the Olympic Charter.

The Games

Ceremonies

In July 2021, Paris 2024 president Tony Estanguet stated that the COJOP2024 was conducting a feasibility study on hosting the opening and closing ceremonies outside of a traditional stadium setting, so that they could "marry the best of Paris–the iconic sites–to the possibility of engaging with hundreds of thousands of people, maybe more." This concept of an "open Games" was exemplified in the Paris 2024 handover presentation during the Tokyo 2020 closing ceremony, which featured a live segment from a viewing party at Place du Trocadéro. Estanguet expected the sites for the ceremonies to be announced by the end of the year.

On 13 December 2021, it was announced that the opening ceremony will feature athletes being transported by boat from Pont d'Austerlitz to Pont d'Iéna along the Seine river. The  route will pass landmarks such as the Louvre, Notre-Dame de Paris, and Place de la Concorde, and feature cultural presentations. The official protocol will take place at a 30,000 seat "mini-stadium" at the Trocadéro. Organisers stated that the ceremony would be the most "spectacular and accessible opening ceremony in Olympic history", with Estanguet stating that it would be free to attend, and estimating that it could attract as many as 600,000 spectators.

On 23 September 2022, the ceremonies' creative director Thomas Jolly announced that Stade de France would host the closing ceremonies.

Sports
As per the current rules of the International Olympic Committee, which have been in force since 2017, the programme of the Summer Olympics consists of 28 mandatory "core" sports that persist between Games, and that up to 6 optional sports can be added in each edition of the Summer Olympics. They are selected by the Organizing Committee of each edition and must be included in a list that will be sent to the International Olympic Committee within 5 years before each edition, in order to improve local interest, provided that the total number of participants does not exceed 10,500 athletes. During the 131st IOC Session in September 2017, the IOC approved the 28 sports of the 2016 programme for Paris 2024, while also inviting the Paris Organising Committee to submit up to five additional sports for consideration.

When Paris was bidding for the games in August 2017, the Paris Organising Committee announced that it would hold talks with the IOC and professional esports organisations about the possibility of introducing competitive events in 2024. In July 2018, the IOC confirmed it would not consider esports for the 2024 Olympics. On 21 February 2019, the Paris Organising Committee announced they would propose the inclusion of breakdancing (breaking), as well as skateboarding, sport climbing, and surfing—three sports which debuted at the then-upcoming 2020 Summer Olympics as optional sports. All four sports were approved during the 134th IOC Session in Lausanne, Switzerland on 24 June 2019.

The 2024 Summer Olympic program is scheduled to feature 32 sports encompassing 329 events, the first Summer Olympics since 1960 to have fewer events than the preceding edition (Tokyo 2020 had 339). The number of events in each discipline is noted in parentheses. Disciplines that lost events from 2020 included karate (8) and baseball/softball (2), which were dropped from the program, and weightlifting, which lost 4 events. In canoeing, 2 sprint events were replaced with 2 slalom events, keeping the overall total at 16. Sports that gained events were breaking (2), introduced as a new discipline, and sports climbing, where the distinct events of speed climbing, and 'boulder & lead' were disaggregated from the previous 'combined' event to create 2 new events.

In February 2023, USA Boxing announced its decision to boycott the 2023 World Championships (organized by the International Boxing Association) where Russian and Belarusian athletes will compete with no restrictions, also accusing the IBA of attempting to sabotage IOC-approved qualification pathway for the 2024 Summer Olympics. Poland, Switzerland, the Netherlands, Great Britain, Ireland, Czechia, Sweden and Canada later joined the U.S.

Participation

*The following is a list of National Olympic Committees who have at least one athlete who has qualified for the 2024 Olympics.

Number of athletes by National Olympic Committee

As of 19 March 2023

Calendar
The following schedule is correct as of the press release by COJOP2024 in July 2022. The exact schedule may change in due time.

Venues
Most of the Olympic events will be held in the city of Paris and its metropolitan region, including the neighbouring cities of Saint-Denis, Le Bourget, Nanterre, Versailles, and Vaires-sur-Marne.  The handball tournaments will be held in Lille, which is 225km from the host city; the sailing and some football games will be held in the Mediterranean city of Marseille, which is 777km from the host city; meanwhile, the surfing events are expected to be held in Teahupo'o village in the overseas territory of French Polynesia, which is 15,716 km from the host city. Football will also be hosted in another 5 cities, which are Bordeaux, Décines-Charpieu, Nantes, Nice and Saint-Étienne, some of which are home to Ligue 1 clubs.

Grand Paris zone (seven sports)

Notes

Paris Centre zone (20 sports)

Versailles zone (four sports)

Outlying (seven sports)

Non-competitive

Marketing

Emblem

The emblem for the 2024 Summer Olympics and Paralympics was unveiled on 21 October 2019 at the Grand Rex. Inspired by Art Deco, it is a representation of Marianne, the national personification of France, with a flame formed in negative space by her hair. The emblem also resembles a gold medal. Tony Estanguet explained that the emblem symbolised "the power and the magic of the Games", and the Games being "for people". The use of a female figure also serves as an homage to the 1900 Summer Olympics in Paris, which were the first to allow women to participate. The emblem was designed by the French designer Sylvain Boyer with the French design agencies Ecobranding & Royalties.

The emblem for Paris 2024 was considered the biggest new logo release of 2019 by many design magazines. An Opinion Way survey shows that 83 percent of French people say they like the new Paris 2024 Games emblem. Approval ratings were high, with 82 percent of those surveyed finding it aesthetically appealing and 78 percent finding it to be creative. It was met with some mockery on social media, one user commenting that the logo "would be better suited to a dating site or a hair salon".

For the first time, since the 1960 Summer Paralympics, the 2024 Summer Paralympics are sharing the same logo, as their corresponding Olympics, with no difference, reflecting a shared "ambition" between both events.

Corporate sponsorship

Broadcasting rights
In France, domestic rights to the 2024 Summer Olympics are owned by Warner Bros. Discovery (formerly Discovery Inc.) via Eurosport, with free-to-air coverage sub-licensed to the country's public broadcaster France Télévisions.

Armenia – APMTV
Asia – Dentsu (rights to be sold to local broadcasters)
Australia – Nine Network
Austria – ORF
Belgium – RTBF, VRT
Brazil – Grupo Globo
Bulgaria – BNT
Canada – CBC/Radio-Canada, TSN, RDS
China – CMG
Croatia – HRT
Colombia – Caracol Televisión
Cyprus – CyBC
Czech Republic – CT
Denmark – DR, TV 2
Estonia – Postimees Group
Europe – Eurosport (partial rights to be sold to local broadcasters)
Finland – Yle
France – France Télévisions
Germany – ARD, ZDF
Greece – ERT
Hungary – MTVA
Iceland – RÚV
Indian subcontinent – Viacom18
Ireland – RTÉ
Israel – Sports Channel
Italy – RAI
Japan – Japan Consortium
Kosovo – RTK
Latin America (except Brazil) – América Móvil
Latvia – LTV
Lithuania – TV3
MENA – beIN Sports
Netherlands – NOS
New Zealand – Sky Television
North Korea – SBS
Pacific Islands – Sky Television
Peru – Grupo ATV
Poland – TVP
Portugal – RTP
Romania – TVR
Serbia – RTS
Slovakia – RTVS
Slovenia – RTV
South Africa – SABC, SuperSport
South Korea – SBS
Spain – RTVE
Sub-Saharan Africa – Infront Sports & Media, SuperSport
Switzerland – SRG SSR
United Kingdom – BBC
United States – NBCUniversal

 – Included nations & territories are Cook Islands, Fiji, Kiribati, Marshall Islands, Federated States of Micronesia, Nauru, Niue, Palau, Samoa, Solomon Islands, Tonga, Tuvalu and Vanuatu.

Controversies

Exploitation of workers' rights
French daily Liberation revealed that workers working for the olympics were being paid around €80 ($86.7) per day without any official declaration, social security, or resting day. Some workers expressed anger and dissatisfaction as they never receive the salary guaranteed on the contract, while some said that there are no proper safety materials for them when doing high risk jobs.

Participation of Russian and Belarusian athletes
The potential participation of Russian and Belarusian athletes has remained controversial amid the Russian invasion of Ukraine. In February 2022, the International Olympic Committee (IOC) recommended sports federations to ban Russian and Belarusian athletes and officials from participating in international tournaments, citing the violation of the Olympic Truce.

In January 2023, the IOC announced plans to introduce Russian and Belarusian athletes as neutrals. In response, Poland's sport and tourism minister stated that up to 40 countries would consider boycotting the 2024 Olympics if the Russians and Belarusians are not excluded. Countries which have threatened a boycott are:
 
 
 
 
 
 

Among the other countries that could boycott the games are also the United Kingdom, Japan, New Zealand and South Korea.

On 1 February 2023, the United Nations released a report, commending the IOC for considering reinstating Russian and Belarusian athletes, and urged the organization to go further and make sure that "no athlete should be required to take sides in the conflict", urging the IOC to "take more steps to align its recommendations with international human rights standards on non-discrimination." The UN also stated that the IOC should "[ensure] the non-discrimination of any athlete on the basis of their nationality. The report summarized that "[the condition to condemn Russia's invasion] opens the door to pressure and interpretation. The same rules must apply to all athletes, whatever their nationality. This includes the rule that any advocacy of national, racial or religious hatred that constitutes incitement to discrimination, hostility or violence shall be prohibited".

Asian and African countries have indicated they would welcome the return of Russian and Belarusian athletes. On 2 February 2023, the United States welcomed the return of Russian and Belarusian athletes, but only under a neutral designation. On 3 February, Czech Republic confirmed it will not join a potential boycott. On 8 February, Greece spoke out against boycotts of any kind, as well as the politicization of the Olympics, affirming their participation in the Games.

In February 2023, the IOC confirmed that it has not entered official discussions as to whether Russian and Belarussian athletes could compete, but the head of the IOC, Thomas Bach, has stated that it should not be up to national governments to decide who gets to participate in international sporting tournaments, indicating that he was also against the banning of athletes from Russia and Belarus.

The IOC published a statement stating that it supported the return of Russian and Belarusian athletes, as long as they did not "actively" support the war and as long as their flag, anthem, colors, and organizations were excluded (thus preventing them from competing under the Russian Olympic Committee as in Tokyo 2020 and Beijing 2022). The IOC additionally stated that they "appreciated" the Olympic Council of Asia giving Russian/Belarusian athletes access to Asian competitions, and compared the situation to the Independent Olympic Participants at the 1992 Summer Olympics. The IOC stated that "the IOC’s exploration enjoys the overwhelming support of the International Federations, their umbrella body (the Association of Summer Olympic International Federations (ASOIF)), the National Olympic Committees (NOCs), including all the five Continental Associations (Association of NOCs of Africa, European Olympic Committees, Olympic Council of Asia, Oceania National Olympic Committees and Panam Sports) plus the Association of National Olympic Committees (ANOC), representing all 206 National Olympic Committees."

The UN and IOC statements provoked an angry reaction from Ukrainian officials, who accused them of appeasing Russia.

On 4 March 2023, the Association of National Olympic Committees of Africa announced their support for the IOC's decision to reinstate Russian and Belarusian athletes as neutrals, as well as the countries' participation in the Olympics.

On 10 March 2023, the International Fencing Federation (FIE) became the first Olympic governing body to officially reinstate Russian and Belarusian athletes and officials, in time for the start of the qualification for the 2024 Games.

See also

Explanatory notes

References

External links
 
 Paris 2024

 
Summer Olympics
Summer Olympics
Summer Olympics
Summer Olympics in Paris
Summer Olympics 2024
2024
Summer Olympics
Summer Olympics